Lataxiena lutescena is a species of sea snail, a marine gastropod mollusc, in the family Muricidae, the murex snails or rock snails.This species was recognized during a reidentification of the Muricidae collection. The name of this species is derived from the Latin word "lutescena", which means "creamy". This refers to the species' creamy, yellow peristome.

References

lutescena
Gastropods described in 2015